Peter Oscar Jørgensen (2 April 1907 – 27 August 1992) was a Danish boxer who competed at the 1932 Summer Olympics.

Born in Hillerød, Hovedstaden he won the bronze medal in 1932 in the light heavyweight class after winning the third place fight against James Murphy in a walkover.

References

External Links
Peter Jørgensen's profile at databaseOlympics
Peter Jørgensen's profile at Sports Reference.com

1907 births
1992 deaths
Boxers at the 1932 Summer Olympics
Light-heavyweight boxers
Olympic boxers of Denmark
Olympic bronze medalists for Denmark
Olympic medalists in boxing
Danish male boxers
Medalists at the 1932 Summer Olympics
People from Hillerød Municipality
Sportspeople from the Capital Region of Denmark